Marcel Wehr is a German footballer who plays as a goalkeeper for TSV Großbardorf.

References

References 
 

Living people
1990 births
Association football goalkeepers
German footballers
VfR Aalen players
SpVgg Neckarelz players
Regionalliga players
3. Liga players